Franky Van der Elst (born 30 April 1961) is a Belgian retired professional footballer who played as a defensive midfielder. He later worked as a manager.

During a 21-year professional career he played mainly with Club Brugge, being regarded as a legend there and briefly coaching the team in the 2000s. Also, he was named by Pelé as one of the top 125 greatest living footballers, in March 2004.

Van der Elst won 86 caps for the Belgium national team, representing the country in four World Cups and retiring at nearly 40 years of age.

Playing career
Born in Ninove, Van der Elst started his professional career at R.W.D. Molenbeek, earning his first call-up for Belgium in 1982. Two years later, he moved to Club Brugge KV and stayed there until he finished his career in 1999, going on to total over 500 overall appearances with the side (466 in the league alone); during four seasons, he often partnered in midfield his namesake Leo – no relation.

Van der Elst won the Golden Shoe twice in his career, an accomplishment for an eminently defensive-minded player. He also appeared in four FIFA World Cups from 1986 to 1998, only scoring once for his country in nearly 90 matches, in a 2–2 friendly draw against Norway on 25 March 1998.

Coaching career
After retiring at the age of 38, Van der Elst was appointed as manager at K.F.C. Germinal Beerschot. After four relatively successful years he was replaced by Marc Brys, and subsequently joined K.S.C. Lokeren Oost-Vlaanderen.

In 2005, Van der Elst returned to 'his' Club Brugge, as an assistant, joining former teammates – both in club and country – Jan Ceulemans, Marc Degryse, Dany Verlinden and René Verheyen. He remained with the team when Verheyen and Ceulemans were fired in 2006, but was eventually shown the door the following year, with head coach Emilio Ferrera.

After a very short spell with FC Brussels, Van der Elst moved to K.V.S.K. United Overpelt-Lommel, both clubs in the second level.

Career statistics

Club

Honours and awards
Club Brugge
Belgian First Division: 1987–88, 1989–90, 1991–92, 1995–96, 1997–98
Belgian Cup: 1985–86, 1990–91, 1994–95, 1995–96
Belgian Supercup: 1986, 1988, 1990, 1991, 1992, 1994, 1996, 1998
Bruges Matins: 1984, 1990, 1992, 1993, 1995, 1996, 1998
Amsterdam Tournament: 1990
Jules Pappaert Cup: 1991, 1995

Belgium
 FIFA World Cup: fourth place 1986

Individual
 FIFA World Cup participations: 1986, 1990, 1994, 1998
Belgian Golden Shoe: 1990, 1996
 Belgian Fair Play Award: 1997
 FIFA 100: 2004
 The Best Golden Shoe Team: 2011
 A song Oh Franky by Raymond van het Groenewoud: 1994
 Honorary citizen of Roosdaal: 2019

References

External links
 
 
 
 

1961 births
Living people
Flemish sportspeople
Belgian footballers
Association football midfielders
Belgian Pro League players
R.W.D. Molenbeek players
Club Brugge KV players
Belgium international footballers
1986 FIFA World Cup players
1990 FIFA World Cup players
1994 FIFA World Cup players
1998 FIFA World Cup players
Belgian football managers
Beerschot A.C. managers
K.S.C. Lokeren Oost-Vlaanderen managers
K.S.V. Roeselare managers
K.V. Oostende managers
FIFA 100
Lommel S.K. managers
Club Brugge KV non-playing staff